The 1984 McDonald's All-American Boys Game was an All-star basketball game played on Sunday, April 8, 1984 at the Pauley Pavilion in Los Angeles, California. The game's rosters featured the best and most highly recruited high school boys graduating in 1984. The game was the 7th annual version of the McDonald's All-American Game first played in 1978.

1984 game
10,214 people attended the game, which was played at the Pauley Pavilion, home of the UCLA Bruins. The East team had many heavily recruited guards and forwards, and top-ranked center Chris Washburn. The West team had the two best forwards of the class, Danny Manning and John Williams. At halftime, the West led 62–56. Derrick Chievous scored 16 points and had 9 rebounds, and was the top scorer of the East team, while John Williams dominated the game with 27 points and 16 rebounds, and was awarded the MVP trophy. Other good performances were Troy Lewis (18 points), Gary Grant (16) and Delray Brooks (16) for the West; and Duane Ferrell (13 points), Ed Davender (13) and Shelton Jones (15) for the East. Of the 24 players, 10 went on to play at least one game in the NBA.

East roster

West roster

Coaches
The East team was coached by:
 Head Coach Bob Wade of Paul Laurence Dunbar High School (Baltimore, Maryland)

The West team was coached by:
 Head Coach Bill Bobier of Valley High School (Las Vegas, Nevada)

References

External links
McDonald's All-American on the web
McDonald's All-American all-time rosters
McDonald's All-American rosters at Basketball-Reference.com
Game stats at Realgm.com

1983–84 in American basketball
1984
1984 in sports in California
Basketball competitions in Los Angeles
1984 in Los Angeles